The 2021 SBS Drama Awards, presented by Seoul Broadcasting System (SBS), was held on December 31, 2021, at 21.00 (KST) at SBS Prism Tower, Sangam-dong, Mapo-gu, Seoul. The show was hosted by Shin Dong-yup and Kim Yoo-jung consecutively for 2nd year. The prelude to drama awards to be aired on SBS TV was released on December 13, 2021. Grand Prize (Daesang) was awarded to Kim So-yeon.

Winners and nominees

Presenters

Performances

See also 
 2021 KBS Drama Awards
 2021 MBC Drama Awards

References

External links 

Seoul Broadcasting System original programming
2021 television awards
SBS Drama Awards
2021 in South Korea
2021 in South Korean television
December 2021 events in South Korea